Marko Mančić (Serbian Cyrillic: Марко Манчић; born 16 November 1983) is a Serbian former professional footballer, who last played as a forward for Radnički Pirot.

Career
Mančić started out at his hometown club Radnički Pirot, making his senior debut in the early 2000s. He switched to Hajduk Kula in the 2003 winter transfer window, recording two appearances and scoring once until the end of the 2002–03 First League of Serbia and Montenegro. In the next three years, Mančić was sent out on loan to Vrbas, Elan Srbobran, and Radnički Pirot (twice).

In mid-2006, Mančić permanently returned to Radnički Pirot, spending two seasons at the club. He subsequently went on to play for Vlasina, Balkanski, and Radnički Niš. In the summer of 2012, Mančić returned again to his parent club Radnički Pirot, helping them win the Serbian League East in 2016, thus earning promotion to the Serbian First League.

In summer 2018, following the end of the 2017–18 Serbian First League campaign and relegation in the Serbian League East, Mančić retired from playing football professionally. He also stayed with Radnički Pirot as an assistant coach.

Honours
Radnički Pirot
 Serbian League East: 2004–05, 2015–16
Radnički Niš
 Serbian League East: 2010–11

References

External links
 Srbijafudbal profile 
 
 

Association football forwards
First League of Serbia and Montenegro players
FK Balkanski players
FK Hajduk Kula players
FK Radnički Niš players
FK Radnički Pirot players
FK Srbobran players
FK Vlasina players
FK Vrbas players
People from Pirot
Serbian First League players
Serbian footballers
Serbian SuperLiga players
1983 births
Living people